Peninsular Spain refers to that part of Spanish territory located within the Iberian Peninsula, thus excluding other parts of Spain: the Canary Islands, the Balearic Islands, Ceuta, Melilla, and a number of islets and crags off the coast of Morocco known collectively as plazas de soberanía (places of sovereignty).  In Spain it is mostly known simply as la Península.  It has land frontiers with France and Andorra to the north; Portugal to the west; and the British territory of Gibraltar to the south.

Characteristics
Peninsular Spain is 492,175 km2 in area - and in population - 43,731,572.  It contains 15 of the autonomous communities of Spain.

Occupying the central part of Spain, it possesses much greater resources and better interior and exterior communications than other parts of the country.  To redress this imbalance, Spanish residents outside the peninsula receive a state subsidy for transport to and from the peninsula.

These are the municipalities with the highest population:
Madrid 3,207,247
Barcelona 1,611,822
Valencia 792,303	
Seville 700,169
Zaragoza 682,004
Málaga 568,479
Murcia 438,246
Bilbao 349,356
Alicante 335,052
Córdoba 328,704

See also
País Vasco peninsular, the portion of the historic Basque Country located in peninsular Spain
Peninsulares, inhabitants of Spanish colonies born in peninsular Spain
Topographical relief of Spain

References

Spain
Geography of Spain